This list details notable events that occurred in 2016 in Germany.

Incumbents
President: Joachim Gauck
Chancellor: Angela Merkel

Events

January
January 1 – New Year's Eve sexual assaults in Germany
January 30–31 - 2016 FIL World Luge Championships in Königssee

February
February 9 - Bad Aibling rail accident
February 3–7 - 2016 German Masters
February 11–21 - 66th Berlin International Film Festival
February 25: Germany in the Eurovision Song Contest 2016

March
 CeBIT in Hanover
 ITB Berlin in Berlin
 Leipzig Book Fair in Leipzig
 Germany in the Eurovision Song Contest 2016
 March 13: Baden-Württemberg state election, 2016
 March 13: Rhineland-Palatinate state election, 2016
 March 13: Saxony-Anhalt state election, 2016
 Böhmermann affair

April
 Hanover Messe in Hanover
 Deutscher Filmpreis in Berlin

May
 10 May: Munich knife attack

June
 Kiel Week in Kiel
2016 Düsseldorf terrorism plot
9-12: 2016 Bilderberg Conference in Dresden

July
July 14–17 - 2016 Extreme Sailing Series in Hamburg
18 July: 2016 Würzburg train attack
22 July: 2016 Munich shooting
24 July: 2016 Ansbach bombing, 2016 Reutlingen machete attack

August
 Hanse Sail in Rostock
 Internationale Funkausstellung Berlin in Berlin

September  
 ILA Berlin Air Show in Berlin
 Gamescom in Cologne
 Frankfurt Motor Show in Frankfurt
 September - October – Oktoberfest in Munich
 September 4: Mecklenburg-Vorpommern state election, 2016
 September 18: Berlin state election, 2016
 September 28: Following a civil trial in Frankfurt, Claudia Dinkel is ordered to pay compensation to journalist and weather presenter Jörg Kachelmann for her false rape accusations against him in 2010. The court found Dinkel guilty of indirect deprivation of liberty through a knowingly untrue criminal complaint, establishing that her injuries had been self inflicted.

October
8 October: 2016 Chemnitz terrorism plot
 Frankfurt Book Fair in Frankfurt
November

 November 27: Nico Rosberg wins the Championship against his teammate Lewis Hamilton, in Abu Dhabi. A week later, Rosberg announces his retirement, allowing Valtteri Bottas to take his seat for next year.

December
19 December: 2016 Berlin truck attack

Deaths 

 January 1: Helmut Koester, American-German  scholar of the New Testament (born 1926)
 January 4: 
 Maja Maranow, German actress (born 1961)
Achim Mentzel, German actor (born 1946)
 January 9: Robert Naegele, German actor (born 1925)
 January 10: Ulrich Hahnen, German politician (born 1952)
 January 12: Ruth Leuwerik, German actress (born 1924)
 January 27: Artur Fischer, German inventor (born 1919)
 January 31: Wolfgang Rademann, German television producer (born 1934)
 February 7: Roger Willemsen, German author, essayist and TV presenter (born 1955)
 February 23: Peter Lustig, German television presenter and author of children's books (born 1937)
 February 26: Karl Dedecius, Polish-born German translator of Polish and Russian literature (born 1921)
 February 29: Hannes Löhr, German football player (born 1942)
 March 18: Guido Westerwelle, German politician (born 1961)
 March 24: Roger Cicero, German jazz and pop musician (born 1970)
 March 31: Hans-Dietrich Genscher, German politician (born 1927)
 April 7: Hendrikje Fitz, German actress (born 1961)
 April 18: Fritz Herkenrath, German football goalkeeper (born 1928)
 April 19: Karl-Heinz von Hassel, German actor (born 1939)
 April 21: Hans Koschnick, German politician (born 1929)
 April 24: Klaus Siebert, German biathlete (born 1955)
 April 28: Georg Kronawitter, German politician (born 1928)
 April 30: Uwe Friedrichsen, German actor (born 1934)
 May 6: Margot Honecker, German politician (born 1927)
 May 6: Klaus Ampler, German cyclist (born 1940)
 May 9: Walther Leisler Kiep, German politician (born 1926)
 May 11: Peter Behrens, German musician (born 1947)
 May 15: Erika Berger, German television moderator (born 1939)
 May 18: Fritz Stern, German-American historian (born 1926)
 May 31: Rupert Neudeck, German journalist (born 1939)
 June 11: Rudi Altig, German cyclist (born 1937)
 June 19: Götz George, German actor (born 1938)
 July 7: Wolfram Siebeck, German author and journalist (born 1928)
 July 12: Miriam Pielhau, German actress and author (born 1975)
 August 14: Hermann Kant, German author (born 1926)
 August 24: Walter Scheel, German politician, former president (born 1919)
 August 24: Henning Voscherau, German politician (born 1941)
 September 10: Jutta Limbach, German politician and jurist (born 1934)
 September 14: Hilmar Thate, German actor (born 1931)
 October 10: Tamme Hanken, German horse whisperer and animals bonesetter (born 1960)
 October 21 : Manfred Krug, German actor (born 1937)
 October 24 : Reinhard Häfner, German footballer (born 1952)
 November 26 : Peter Hintze, German politician (born 1950)
 December 2 : Gisela May, German actress and singer (born 1924)
 December 7: Hildegard Hamm-Brücher, German politician (born 1921)
 December 27: Hans Tietmeyer, German economist (born 1931)

References

 
Germany
Germany
2010s in Germany
Years of the 21st century in Germany